Kalali (also Romanized as Kalālī and Kolālī; also known as Bāgh-e Kalāyī and Bāgh-e Kalālī) is a village in Darb-e Gonbad Rural District, Darb-e Gonbad District, Kuhdasht County, Lorestan Province, Iran. At the 2006 census, its population was 79, in 16 families.

References 

Towns and villages in Kuhdasht County